Noondoonia station is a pastoral lease located north of Balladonia, Western Australia on the Eyre Highway in the Goldfields-Esperance region.  It is adjacent to Balladonia Station.

It was established in 1883 by John Cook. Cook originally selected  of land which later acted as the home station. Additional plots were added and the property occupied  in 1933.

The Cook family were long associated with the station, originally focusing on cattle and later sheep.

Life in the isolated station was not without hardships, and in particular wild dogs.

See also
Nanambinia Station
List of ranches and stations
List of pastoral leases in Western Australia

Notes

Homesteads in Western Australia
Pastoral leases in Western Australia
Stations (Australian agriculture)
Goldfields-Esperance
Eyre Highway